The Miss Ecuador 1995, Radmila Pandzic from Manabí, was crowned on January 5, 1995 through a casting that was held in Ecuavisa after she finished her year as Miss Ecuador 1994's 1st Runner-up. She was not crowned by Mafalda Arboleda from Guayas, Miss Ecuador 1994, since she was relegated from her duties. She competed at Miss Universe 1995, but she did no place. Also, Ana Trujillo from Guayas was selected to compete at Miss World 1995.

Results

External links

Miss Ecuador